Joseph ben Hayyim Jabez (also "Yaavetz") (1438-1539) was a Spanish-Jewish theologian. He lived for a time in Portugal, where he associated with Joseph Hayyun, who inspired him with that taste for mysticism which he subsequently displayed in his writings. When the Jews were banished from Spain Jabez settled at Mantua, Italy. There he met his compatriot, the kabbalist Judah Hayyat, whom he induced to write the commentary Minḥat Yehudah on the kabbalistic work Ma'areket Elahut.

Jabez was an opponent of philosophy. For him the truth of the Jewish religion is demonstrated by the miracles recorded in the Bible. He criticizes the thirteen articles of faith of Maimonides, the six of Hasdai Crescas, and the three of Albo. According to him, only the following three, alluded to in the verse "I am that I am" (Ex. iii. 14), are the fundamental principles of Judaism:
 That God is one
 That He governs the world
 That in the end all mankind will believe in His unity

These dogmas are expounded by him in the following books: 
 Ḥasde Adonai (Constantinople, 1533), an ethical work wherein the author demonstrates that the wise man is more grateful to God for his misfortunes than for worldly advantages
 Ma'amar ha-Aḥdut (Ferrara, 1554), on the unity of God
 Perush 'al Masseket Abot (ib. 1555), on the sayings of the Fathers, mentioned by the author of Yesod ha-Emunah
 Or ha-Ḥayyim (ib. 1555), against philosophy
 A commentary on the Psalms (Salonica, 1571)

Jabez left also a great number of manuscript works, which, according to Ghirondi, are still (as of 1906) in the possession of the author's descendants.

Jewish Encyclopedia bibliography 
David Conforte, Ḳore ha-Dorot, p. 30a;
Azulai, Shem ha-Gedolim, ii. 4;
Graziadio Nepi-Mordecai Ghirondi, Toledot Gedole Yisrael, p. 158;
Adolf Jellinek, in Orient, Lit. vii. 262;
Moritz Steinschneider, Cat. Bodl. col. 1474;
Hermann Vogelstein and Paul Rieger, Geschichte der Juden in Rom, ii. 66.

References

Spanish Jews
15th-century births
16th-century deaths
16th-century Sephardi Jews
Kabbalists
Philosophers of Judaism
Jews expelled from Spain in 1492